Municipal elections took place in Iceland on 31 May 2014. 66% of eligible voters cast votes, the lowest proportion since Iceland gained independence.

As part of a pledge, Mayor Jón Gnarr's Best Party did not participate in the election and was dissolved after the election was held.

Results

Overall

Results in Reykjavík

In total, 56,896 votes were cast. Of these, 2,024 were blank and 227 were invalid.

On 11 June 2014, a coalition was announced of the Social Democrats, Bright Future, the Left-Greens, and the Pirate Party. Dagur B. Eggertsson, of the Social Democrats, became the new mayor, while the Left-Green councillor Sóley Tómasdóttir became president of the city council and Sigurður Björn Blöndal of Bright Future became the city council chairperson. The coalition did not invite Progressive Party councillors onto the city’s councils and committees, with Sóley Tómasdóttir saying that the party was not “suitable” for the jobs; this has been taken partly to relate to the councillors' opposition to the Reykjavík Mosque.

References

External links
Municipal Elections in 2014 RUV 

Municipal elections in Iceland
Iceland
2014 in Iceland
Iceland